Guy Smet (born 4 February 1972 in Beveren-Waas) is a Belgian cyclist.

Major results
2007
1st Stage 7 Tour du Faso
2008
1st Overall Tour du Faso
1st Stages 1 & 10
2009
3rd UCI Africa Tour
2011
1st Stage 6 Tour of Rwanda
2015
3rd Overall Tour de Côte d'Ivoire

References

1972 births
Living people
Belgian male cyclists
People from Beveren
Cyclists from East Flanders